Kirsten Kasper is an American professional triathlete.

College career
She was a cross country runner for the Georgetown Hoyas.

Professional career

2016 season
She won world championship gold in the mixed relay.

Kasper won her first World Cup event in Salinas, Ecuador.

2017 season
Kasper finished 4th in the 2017 ITU World Triathlon Series rankings by virtue of a 4th place finish in the Finale.  This final ranking was highlighted by her first WTS podium, a third in Yokohama.

References

1991 births
Living people
American female triathletes
21st-century American women